Ersboda SK  is a Swedish football team from Ersboda in Umeå Municipality. In 2010 they were playing in Division 2 Norrland after relegation from Division 1 Norra in 2008. In the 2017 season, the club is competing in the Division 5 Södra.

Season to season

Attendances

In recent seasons Ersboda SK have had the following average attendances:

Footnotes

External links
 Ersboda SK – official site
 Ersboda SK Men's First Team – official site
  Ersboda Sportklubb Facebook

Association football clubs established in 1986
Defunct football clubs in Sweden
Football clubs in Västerbotten County
Association football clubs disestablished in 2010
1986 establishments in Sweden
2010 disestablishments in Sweden